Jurica Pađen (born 3 February 1955) is a Croatian singer and guitarist. He was a founding member of the bands Parni valjak and Aerodrom and member of Azra and Grupa 220. During the 1990s he started his own group Pađen Band. In the 2000s he was also a part of the 4 asa supergroup along with Rajko Dujmić, Vlado Kalember and Alen Islamović.

Pađen also participated in the wartime Hrvatski Band Aid, and also appeared on the compilation Rock za Hrvatsku with his war song "Tko to tamo gine" (Who's dying over there).

Biography 
Pađen was born in Zagreb. He grew up listening to The Beatles, who encouraged him to enroll in music school. He played classical guitar, and after graduating from lower music school, he started playing and composing his first rock and roll songs. After graduating from music school, he joined Grupa 220, which in 1975 became the Parni Valjak. He remained in that group for three years. After leaving Parni Valjak, in 1978 he founded the group Aerodrom, with which he recorded five studio albums, and in 1987 he became a member of the group Azra, in which he remained for the next three years.

With Tomislav Šojat in 1994, he founded the group Pađen band, which recorded three studio albums, one album intended for the foreign market and a compilation of the biggest hits. After seven years, they reunited the group Aerodrom, with which they recorded and at the end of 2001 released the album Na travi.

Career 
He started music career after finishing primary school. At the age of 15, he became a member of the Zoo Band. After the Zoo Band, he played in the bands Spectrum and Hobo.

In 1974, he joined the Grupa 220, which later became the Parni Valjak. He stayed with them for three years and recorded the album Slike. He left the band due to disagreements with Hussein Hasanfendic Hus, who liked to lead the lead.

In 1978 he founded his rock band Aerodrom, with which he recorded five studio albums. The Aerodrom was the largest representative of the so-called new wave. The plan was for Aerodrom to play the Croatian version of simpho rock. In addition to him, singer Zlatan Živković, bassist Remo Kartagine, keyboardist Mladen Krajnik and drummer Paolo Sfeci were also at Aerodrom. It is an interesting fact that Jura Stublić wanted to become the singer of the Aerodrom, but Pađen did not accept him into the band because of his deep voice.

The first big performance of Aerodrom was in Novi Sad at the BOOM festival, in December 1978, and they also performed at the big concert of Bijelo dugme in Belgrade.

Personal life 
Jurica Pađen is married to Ana Šuto, who is also a musician - she sings and plays guitar and piano. Ana is originally from Zmijavec, a small town in the Imotski region, and is a former singer of the group Ana i dva guna. She graduated in economics and enrolled in the study of theater studies. She and Jurica met and became close in 2004 during the recording of his album Žicanje. When talking about his wife, Padjen often points out that the most important thing for her is that he can trust her, and that he "at first" realized that she would be a good wife and mother. They have been married since 2005 and have a son Vito and a daughter Mila. From a previous relationship, Jurica now has an adult daughter, Tara.

Although Pađen enjoyed the status of an eternal bachelor for a long time, he fell in love with his wife Ana so much that he dedicated the song Dovela si me u red to her. He dedicated the song Mila moja to his daughter Mila, and Mila also acted in the video.

Discography

Grupa 220
1975 - Slike

Parni valjak
1976 - Dođite na show!
1977 - Glavom kroz zid

Aerodrom
1979 - Kad misli mi vrludaju
1981 - Tango Bango
1982 - Obične ljubavne pjesme
1984 - Dukat i pribadače
1986 - Trojica u mraku
1996 - Flash Back 1979-1986
2001 - Na travi
2007 - Rock @ Roll
2008 - The Ultimate Collection
2009 - Hitovi i legende
2012 - Taktika noja
2018 - The Original Album Collection
2019 - Dnevni rituali

Azra
1987 - Između krajnosti
1988 - Zadovoljština

Branimir "Johnny" Štulić
1989 - Balkanska rapsodija
1990 - Balegari ne vjeruju sreći

Pađen Band
1993 - Hamburger city
1995 - Slatka mala stvar
1997 - Izbrisani grafiti
2000 - Retro 16

4 Asa
2003 - Live
2003 - Priče iz Dubrovnika
2004 - Nakon svih ovih godina

Solo
2005 - Žicanje
2014 - All Stars

References

External links
Jurica Pađen discography

20th-century Croatian male singers
Croatian rock musicians
Croatian rock guitarists
21st-century Croatian male singers
Croatian rock singers
Living people
Musicians from Zagreb
1955 births
Yugoslav male singers